2018 Kashiwa Reysol season.

Squad
As of 10 January 2018.

Out on loan

J1 League

References

External links
 J.League official site

Kashiwa Reysol
Kashiwa Reysol seasons